Pedro Henrique Silva dos Santos (born 5 February 2006), known as Pedro or Pedrinho, is a Brazilian footballer who plays as a forward for Corinthians.

Club career
Pedro joined Corinthians at the age of nine, initially playing for the club's futsal team. He signed his first professional contract with Corinthians in March 2022, keeping him with the club until 2025. In September of the same year, he trained with the club's first team for the first time.

International career
Pedro was first called up for the Brazil under-16 team for the 2022 Montaigu Tournament, scoring against Mexico enroute to the final. He was called up to the Brazil under-17 for four friendlies against Chile and Paraguay later in the same year, scoring twice.

Personal life
Pedro is close friends with Palmeiras player Endrick Felipe, with the two first meeting at under-11 level, and going on to represent Brazil at youth level together.

Honours
Brazil U20
 South American U-20 Championship: 2023

References

2006 births
Living people
Brazilian footballers
Brazil youth international footballers
Association football forwards
Sport Club Corinthians Paulista players